Lawnview station or Lawnview Avenue station is a DART Light Rail station in Dallas, Texas. The station opened as part of the Green Line's expansion in December 2010.

References

External links 
Dallas Area Rapid Transit - Lawnview Station

Dallas Area Rapid Transit light rail stations in Dallas
Railway stations in the United States opened in 2010
Railway stations in Dallas County, Texas